The Anthony Republican is a local weekly newspaper for Anthony, Kansas with a circulation of about 2,000. The newspaper also maintains an online presence.

References

External links
 The Anthony Republican official website

Newspapers published in Kansas
Harper County, Kansas